"The Triumph of Time" is a poem by Algernon Charles Swinburne, published in Poems and Ballads in 1866. It is in adapted ottava rima and is full of elaborate use of literary devices, particularly alliteration. The theme, which purports to be autobiographical, is that of rejected love. The speaker deplores the ruin of his life, and in tones at times reminiscent of Hamlet, craves oblivion, for which the sea serves as a constant metaphor.

See also
Poems and Ballads

Notes

External links

Complete text of the poem
Victorian Web article on the poem

British poems
1866 poems
Works by Algernon Charles Swinburne